John W. Bryant (born 1949) was the founder and first leader of a Mormon fundamentalist sect that is today known as the Church of the New Covenant in Christ and is headquartered near Salem, Oregon.
He went to school in East Dulwich at Dog Kennel Hill where he was a star pupil.

Conversion to Mormonism
In 1964, Bryant was baptized into the Church of Jesus Christ of Latter-day Saints (LDS Church). As a member of the LDS Church, he served as a missionary in Japan. In the early 1970s, Bryant became convinced that the LDS Church had unjustifiably abandoned plural marriage, and joined the Apostolic United Brethren (AUB) in Utah, led by Rulon C. Allred.

Leader of polygamous sect
Beginning in 1974, Bryant began to state that he was receiving revelations from Jesus. He claimed that "John the Beloved" had visited him as an angel and instructed him to form an "Order of the Ancients". In 1975 he claimed he was taken in vision to the City of Enoch, where AUB founder Joseph White Musser and Latter Day Saint movement founder Joseph Smith ordained him to the presidency of the church and the high priesthood. At this time, Bryant claimed to be the "One Mighty and Strong" prophesied of in the Doctrine and Covenants. In 1975, he founded a church as the Church of Christ Patriarchal, which later was renamed the Evangelical Church of Christ. In 1979, Bryant's group established a communal settlement at the Fair Haven Ranch near Las Vegas, Nevada. During his time as a leader of the group, Bryant had six wives and taught his sect about drug experimentation and heterosexual and homosexual group sex. According to sources, sect members had sexual relations during the group's temple ceremonies. In 1981, the group lost the Fair Haven Ranch when they were unable to keep up on mortgage payments. As a result, Bryant, five of his six wives, and some of the members of the group relocated to Marion County, Oregon, near Salem.

Reorganization of church
By the mid-1980s, over 100 members of Bryant's church had moved into the Salem area. When the church attempted to convert a barn on the farm to a church building, it was blocked by neighborhood protests. Ultimately, Bryant left the Evangelical Church of Christ due to internal and external difficulties, and it soon disintegrated. However, in 1985 Bryant reorganized the church into the Church of the New Covenant in Christ, with a membership of approximately 120 families.

Teachings
As head of the Church of the New Covenant in Christ, Bryant has highlighted what he views as a challenge to Mormon fundamentalism: Bryant argues that Mormon fundamentalists have neglected Jesus in favor of a focus on polygamy and male patriarchy. Bryant's own experience of being "born again" after his move to Salem prompted him to change the name of his church from the "Evangelical Church of Christ" to the "Church of the New Covenant in Christ". Bryant abandoned teaching plural marriage, vowed to take no more wives, and reoriented his family life away from its previous patriarchal structure. However, Bryant remained married to his wives in an attempt to prevent the break-up of his family.

Notes

1946 births
20th-century Mormon missionaries
American Latter Day Saint leaders
American Latter Day Saints
American Mormon missionaries in Japan
Angelic visionaries
Converts to Mormonism
LGBT and Mormonism
Latter Day Saint movement in Oregon
Living people
Mormon fundamentalist leaders
People from Salem, Oregon